Utarovo (Utar) is a rural locality (a selo) in Mikhaylovsky Selsoviet, Bakalinsky District, Bashkortostan, Russia. The population was 207 as of 2010. There is 1 street.

Geography 
Utarovo is located 28 km south of Bakaly (the district's administrative centre) by road. Ustyumovo is the nearest rural locality.

References 

Rural localities in Bakalinsky District